Hassan Fahmi al-Badawi, (7 September 1910 – 9 July 1987) was an Egyptian judge and political figure who was Justice Minister, from 1970–1971.

Early life 
Hassan Fahmi al-Badawi was born in Giza Governorate in Egypt on 7 September 1910.

He was enrolled in the al-Saidia school and then attended the Faculty of Law at Cairo University.

Career 
Hassan Fahmi al-Badawi joined the judiciary upon graduation and was eventually appointed to the head of the Court of Cassation. He was also the presiding judge in the trial of the Champagne Spy Wolfgang Lotz in 1965.

He was appointed Justice Minister of Egypt in the second and third cabinets of Mahmoud Fawzi during the presidency of Anwar Sadat from 18 November 1970 to 12 September 1971.

Family 
Hassan Fahmi al-Badawi was married to Soad Salem el-Sayed niece of Ahmed Lutfi el-Sayed.

References

External links

1987 deaths
1910 births
Judges from Cairo
Justice ministers of Egypt
20th-century Egyptian judges

Cairo University alumni